Tian Yong (born 12 January 1987) is a Chinese footballer currently playing as a midfielder for Qingdao Youth Island.

Career statistics

Club

References

1987 births
Living people
Chinese footballers
Association football midfielders
China League Two players